Jorf El Melha is a town in Sidi Kacem Province, Rabat-Salé-Kénitra, Morocco. According to the 2004 census it has a population of 20,581. The climate in Jorf El Melha is mild and generally warm. The average annual temperature is 19.6°C. Winter is a rainier season than summer and average precipitation per year is 619mm.

References

Populated places in Sidi Kacem Province
Municipalities of Morocco